Digital Health Canada, formerly known as COACH, Canada's Health Informatics Association runs the COACH e-Health Conference, a Canadian conference and trade show dedicated to eHealth.  The conference alternates between Vancouver, British Columbia and Toronto, Ontario in Canada. The 2015 conference was held in Toronto.

References

External links 
 COACH e-Health Conference

Medical and health organizations based in Ontario